Philip Geipel (born 9 December 1986 in Plauen) is a German auto racing driver.

In 2004 he entered the German Toyota Yaris Cup, winning the championship in 2005. He has competed in the FIA World Touring Car Championship in 2006 and 2007. Both times he raced in two rounds at Brno for the Yaco Racing Team in a Toyota Corolla. He raced a Toyota Auris in the 2008 German ADAC Procar Series, winning the championship in what was his third year in the series. He returned to the WTCC in 2009 for Engstler Motorsport.

Racing record

Complete WTCC results
(key) (Races in bold indicate pole position) (Races in italics indicate fastest lap)

References

External links
 
 

1986 births
Living people
People from Plauen
Racing drivers from Saxony
German racing drivers
World Touring Car Championship drivers
ADAC GT Masters drivers
European Touring Car Cup drivers

Engstler Motorsport drivers